Aeolochroma saturataria is a moth of the family Geometridae first described by Francis Walker in 1866. It is found in Australia.

References

Moths described in 1866
Pseudoterpnini
Moths of Australia